Clube Atlético Carlos Renaux, commonly known as Carlos Renaux, is a Brazilian football club based in Brusque, Santa Catarina state. They won the Campeonato Catarinense twice.

History
The club was founded on September 14, 1913, as Sport Club Brusquense. The club was renamed to Clube Atlético Carlos Renaux on March 19, 1944. They won the Campeonato Catarinense in 1950 and in 1953. Carlos Renaux and Paysandu-SC fused on October 12, 1987 to form Brusque Futebol Clube.

However, they were disestablished in 1987 to create Brusque Futebol Clube, the club returned in 1997, remains active and plays in the second tier of Campeonato Catarinense.

Stadium

Clube Atlético Carlos Renaux played their home games at Estádio Augusto Bauer. The stadium has a maximum capacity of 5,000 people.

Achievements

 Campeonato Catarinense:
 Winners (2): 1950, 1953

References

Football clubs in Santa Catarina (state)
Association football clubs established in 1913
Brusque Futebol Clube
1913 establishments in Brazil